Cohors Prima Vangionum Milliaria Equitata was a Roman auxiliary infantry cohort.

The cohort was stationed at Condercum (Newcastle upon Tyne, Tyne and Wear) on Hadrian's wall

See also 
 Roman auxiliaries
 List of Roman auxiliary regiments

Military of ancient Rome
Auxiliary peditata units of ancient Rome
Hadrian's Wall